Agnes Mary Sanford (November 4, 1897 – February 21, 1982) was an American Christian writer. She is most known for founding the Inner Healing movement, a process she described as the healing of memories.

Education
Agnes attended the Shanghai American School as a teenager before leaving to the United States to attend Peace College, a Presbyterian women's college in Raleigh, NC. After three years there, she received her certificate in education. Since the teaching certification only allowed her to teach in North Carolina, she then applied and was accepted at Agnes Scott College in Georgia. She planned on receiving her bachelor's degree, but after learning she would be required to take courses in math, science, and French, she switched to a non-degree "special" student so she could take additional courses in writing, poetry, and art during her final year. She finished in 1919 and returned to China where she taught English at the Presbyterian mission station before teaching at St. Mary's School in Shanghai and then the Soochow Academy, both Episcopal schools in Shanghai. It was at the latter that she met and married her husband, Edgar (Ted) Sanford.

Career
Sanford holds a significant place in church history for the 20th century. As a child of Presbyterian missionaries in China, she was taught the doctrine of Cessationism, which declared that miracles—especially healing—had been temporary for the New Testament Church and then had immediately ceased. Through her ministry and books, however, she demonstrated that miracles and healing still occur. Additionally, Sanford is recognized as the founder of the Inner Healing Movement, a type of prayer geared toward healing of memories and emotions.  She married the Episcopal priest Edgar L. Sanford. Because of her membership in the Episcopal Church, Agnes had a profound effect upon Christians who otherwise might not accept the validity of the Baptism of the Holy Spirit and the continuation of the Gifts of the Spirit. Sanford published her first book, The Healing Light, more than a decade prior to the recognized emergence of the Charismatic Movement, and it is often considered a classic in its field. Written from a scientific and metaphysical perspective, it appealed to a wide audience by connecting with those seeking a balanced, mediated position. It had already circulated enough by the 1960s to be considered by some to be the movement’s main source for a practical theology of healing prayer. Agnes became a regular speaker at Camps Farthest Out conferences and has often been referenced by well-known authors, such as Francis MacNutt, John Sandford, and Leanne Payne. These factors together resulted in her having a foundational impact on the early Charismatic Movement. In these respects, Sanford became a significant and foundational part of the Renewal Movement in the first half of the twentieth century.

Publications 
1947 - The Healing Light: On the Art and Method of Spiritual Healing from the Christian Viewpoint and in the Christian Tradition, St. Paul: Macalester Park Publishing. (Later editions removed the subtitle).
1950 - Oh Watchman!: A Novel, Philadelphia: Lippincott.
1950 - Lost Shepherd: A Moving Novel of Life in the Spirit. New York: J. B. Lippincott.
1954 - Let's Believe, New York: Harper & Row
1956 - A Pasture for Peterkin. Saint Paul: Macalester Park.
1958 - Behold Your God. St. Paul: Macalester Park. 
1963 - Dreams Are for Tomorrow. Philadelphia: J. B. Lippincott.
1964 - "Spiritual Healing." In The Church's Ministry of Healing: A Manual for Clergy and Laity. Los Angeles: The Episcopal Church.
1965 - How to Learn. (Booklet) Cincinnati: Forward Movement Publications. 
1965 - The Second Mrs. Wu. Philadelphia: J. B. Lippincott.
1966 - Healing Gifts of the Spirit. New York: J. B. Lippincott. 
1968 - The Rising River. New York: J. B. Lippincott.
1969 - The Healing Power of the Bible. San Francisco: Harper & Row.
1969 - "The Healing of Memories." Guideposts 24, no. 9.
1970 - "Birth on Death Row." In God Ventures: True Accounts of God in the Lives of Men by Irene Burk Harrell. Plainfield: Logos International. 
1971 - Twice Seven Words. Plainfield: Logos. 
1971 - "Thy Kingdom Come." Weekly Unity 63, no. 9.
1972 - Sealed Orders. South Plainfield: Bridge.
1973 - "Seeking Earnestly the Best Gifts." New Covenant 3, no. 5.
1975 - Route 1. Plainfield: Logos.
1976 - Melissa and the Little Red Book. Saint Paul: Macalester Park. 
1978 - Creation Waits. Plainfield: Logos.

References

 Baltz, Francis Burkhardt. "Agnes Sanford: A Creative Intercessor." Master's thesis, Nashotah House, 1979.
 DeArteaga, William L. Agnes Sanford and Her Companions: The Assault on Cessationism and the Coming of the Charismatic Renewal. Eugene: Wipf & Stock, 2015. 
 Dignard, Martin L. "Agnes Sanford: Her Influences, Theology, and Contributions." Doctoral dissertation, Regent University, 2016.
 Hocken, Peter D. "Sanford, Agnes Mary." In The New International Dictionary of Pentecostal and Charismatic Movements, edited by Stanley M. Burgess and Ed M. Van der Maas. Grand Rapids: Zondervan, 2002.

External links
 The Healing Light website
 Data of place of birth, genealogical website .... this genealogical link is NOT a match for Agnes Mary White Sanford. In actuality, she was born in China to missionary parents from Virginia(father: Hugh Watt White, mother: Augusta Graves White)

1897 births
1982 deaths
American Episcopalians
American spiritual writers
Agnes Scott College alumni
William Peace University alumni